Vasum floridanum is an extinct species of medium to large sea snail, a marine gastropod mollusk in the family Turbinellidae.

Distribution
Fossils of this marine species have been found in Tertiary strata of Florida, USA.

References

External links
 McGinty, T. L. (1940). New land and marine Tertiary shells from southern Florida. The Nautilus. 53(3): 81-84, pl. 10.

floridanum
Gastropods described in 1940